Stockinbingal is a former passenger railway station on the Lake Cargelligo railway line in New South Wales, Australia. The station opened in 1893 and closed to passenger services in 1983. The station survives largely intact, in good condition, as a safeworking location. Stockinbingal is the junction location of the cross country line to Parkes on the Broken Hill line.

The station still has a short crossing loop, and a junction for the line to Temora.

References 

Disused regional railway stations in New South Wales
Railway stations in Australia opened in 1893
Railway stations closed in 1983